Lake Como is an unincorporated community located in Jasper County, Mississippi, United States. Lake Como lies one mile east of Tallahoma Creek. 

A post office operated under the name Lake Como from 1859 to 1951.

The founder of Bay Springs, L. L. Denson, moved there from Lake Como in the early 1900s.

Notes

Unincorporated communities in Jasper County, Mississippi
Unincorporated communities in Mississippi